Waterhales is a hamlet and a farm near the M25 motorway, in the Brentwood District, in the county of Essex, England. It is located about three miles away from the town of Brentwood. As its name suggests, there are a few ponds in Waterhales.

References 
Essex A-Z (page 95)

Borough of Brentwood
Hamlets in Essex